Chiloglanis macropterus is a species of upside-down catfish endemic to Zambia where it occurs in the Luongo River. This species grows to a length of  TL.

References

External links 

macropterus
Freshwater fish of Africa
Fish of Zambia
Endemic fauna of Zambia
Fish described in 1975